Zophodia lignea is a species of snout moth in the genus Zophodia. It was described by Joseph de Joannis in 1927. It is found in Mozambique and South Africa.

References

Moths described in 1927
Phycitini